Mihălășeni is a commune in Ocnița District, Moldova. It is composed of two villages, Grinăuți and Mihălășeni.

References

Communes of Ocnița District